NFPA 1901, the Standard for Automotive Fire Apparatus, is published by the National Fire Protection Association to outline the standard for firefighting apparatus. The listing sets minimum standards for mechanical, cosmetic, lighting, and all equipment to be included with fire apparatus to be standards compliant in the United States. Current version of 1901 is 2016 edition.

As described by National Fire Protection Association: "NFPA 1901 defines the requirements for new automotive fire apparatus designed to be used under emergency conditions for transporting personnel and equipment, and to support the suppression of fires and mitigation of other hazardous situations. This Standard covers everything from pumpers to aerial fire apparatus to special service apparatus, such as rescue vehicles and haz-mat vehicles, as well as quints and mobile foam apparatus."

History

In the 1975, NFPA 1901 was designated as the numerical code for an accumulation of edits and revisions regarding automotive safety beginning in 1965 and was titled, Standard on Automotive Fire Apparatus. The most recent substantial edit was in 1991, which required the driving and cab area be completely enclosed, mandatory access handrails, and reflective striping on all fire apparatus.

References

External links
 Full text of NFPA 1901 (Requires registration)

Firefighting equipment
Safety codes
Automotive standards
NFPA Standards